The Choctaw-Apache Community of Ebarb, also known as the Choctaw-Apache Tribe of Ebarb, is a state-recognized tribe and nonprofit organization in Louisiana. The community describes themselves as the descendants of Choctaw and Lipan Apache people and is primarily based in the town of Zwolle, Louisiana, with pow-wow grounds in Ebarb, Louisiana, both of which are in Sabine Parish, Louisiana, where the group say they have lived since the early 1700s.

They have been seeking federal recognition as a Native American tribe since the late 1970s.

History
The Choctaw-Apache Community of Ebarb coalesced in the early 1700s, after the Spanish founded Nuestra Señora del Pilar de Los Adaes Presidio, a fort in the area defended by Mestizo and Spanish soldiers. They married or had unions with local Caddo, Adai, and formerly enslaved Lipan Apache women living in the area.When the Spanish dissolved the fort in 1773 and ordered the soldiers to return to San Antonio, many remained behind with their families. They settled in the area of Zwolle and Ebarb.

Following the Louisiana Purchase by the United States in 1803, bands of Choctaw began moving into this area in search of new hunting grounds. Additional Choctaw were moved into the area by US Indian Agent John Sibley. Twenty-one Choctaw families were listed in the 1870 Census for the area. 

In the 20th century, the people mostly worked in the timber and oil industries. They lived along the east bank of the Sabine River until the states of Texas and Louisiana created a project to dam it for flood control and power generation. The states claimed 180,000 acres of the ancestral land to create the Toledo Bend Reservoir. The people in the area were forced to move.

Language

The Ebarb community has traditionally spoken a dialect of Spanish dating from the establishment of Los Adaes. Due to the community's history, their dialect is derived from Colonial-era Mexican Spanish of the late 18th century, and bears little resemblance to Isleño Spanish. A similar dialect has been spoken around Moral, west of Nacogdoches, on the other side of the Toledo Bend Reservoir, which also derives from the Los Adaes settlement. This dialect is very endangered; as of the 1980s, there were no more than 50 fluent speakers on either side of the Sabine River.

Membership 
In 2008 the group reports they had 2,300 enrolled members living in the area, and additional members in other regions.

Organization 
The group formed a 501(c)(3) nonprofit organization in 1977, with the mission "to assist tribe members and obtain federal recognition. Continued to work on member documentation needed for federal recognition."

State-recognition 
The Choctaw-Apache Community of Ebarb received state recognition as a tribe by the state of Louisiana in 1978 by legislative action (also reported as 1977).

Letter of intent to petition for federal recognition 
In 1978, Raymond Ebarb called for federal recognition. The US Department of the Interior; converted the request to a letter of intent to petition. A preliminary petition was filed in 1994 by Tommy Bolton, however, the organization has not yet submitted a completed petition for federal recognition under the revised regulations.

Activities 
The group hosts an annual powwow in mid-April in Noble, Louisiana.

Further reading

Notes

External links
 

1977 establishments in Louisiana
Choctaw heritage groups
Cultural organizations based in Louisiana
Non-profit organizations based in Louisiana
Native American tribes in Louisiana
State-recognized tribes in the United States